Ephedra boelckei is a species of Ephedra that is native to Argentina.

It was originally described by Fidel Antonio Roig in 1984. It has been placed in section Alatae.

References

boelckei
Flora of Argentina
Plants described in 1984